Saint-Lambert station in Saint-Lambert, Quebec, Canada, serves Exo commuter rail, Via Rail and Amtrak intercity rail, and RTL buses. It is located at 329 Saint-Denis Ave. at the corner of Victoria Ave.

The station is served by two Via Rail lines: the Ocean and Ottawa-Quebec City Corridor service, and one Amtrak train, the Adirondack, which links to New York City. It is also used by Exo for commuter rail service on the Mont-Saint-Hilaire line. There are four local buses routes stopping at this station. The station was staffed by VIA Rail ticket agents until October 25, 2012. Since then, it has been unstaffed, but the station building is open before and after train arrival and departure times, to serve as a shelter for waiting passengers.  It is not wheelchair-accessible. It is in ARTM fare zone B, and has 320 parking spaces. Prior to the reform of the ARTM's fare system in July 2022, it was in zone 3.

The station serves as the Via Rail station for nearby Longueuil, which does not have an intercity rail station of its own.

In 2012, plans were announced for the Adirondack to bypass the station entirely in the near future, following the opening of a new U.S. Customs preclearance facility at Montreal's Central Station. Under this scenario, Saint-Lambert would be dropped from the Adirondack route to expedite scheduling.  As of March 2017, the United States Congress had passed the necessary legislation and the Parliament of Canada was considering it.

Bus connections

References

External links

 RTM station page
 Saint Lambert VIA & Amtrak Station (Train Web)

Exo commuter rail stations
Via Rail stations in Quebec
Amtrak stations in Canada
Transport in Saint-Lambert, Quebec
Buildings and structures in Saint-Lambert, Quebec
Railway stations in Montérégie
Railway stations in Canada opened in 2000